100.3 The Beat may refer to:

 KATZ-FM, a radio station (100.3 FM) licensed to Bridgeton, Missouri, United States
 KKLQ (FM) in Los Angeles, California, under the call sign KKBT
 WPHI-FM in Pennsauken, New Jersey